Tamra Mercieca (born 29 September 1980) is an Australian author, therapist, and founder of Getting Naked Pty Ltd.

Biography

Mercieca was born in Kyneton, Victoria, Australia. She attended Kyneton Secondary College, before going on to complete a Graduate Diploma of Arts in Commercial Radio in Melbourne. She spent ten years working in radio as a newsreader and journalist.

Career
In 2002, Mercieca won the Australian Commercial Radio Award for Best News Presenter in a provincial market. During this time, she also had walk-on roles in various television shows such as Neighbours, Last Man Standing, and 'The Secret Life of Us'.

Writing from a young age, it wasn't until her own battle with depression that she was inspired to pen her first book, The Upside of Down: A personal journey and toolkit for overcoming depression, self-published in Australia in 2009. The book was endorsed by Lifeline Australia – the organization asking her to become an advocate.

Mercieca's recovery and subsequent discoveries led her to become trained in various skills, acquiring a Life and Business certificate in Coaching, before going on to learn the art of neuro-linguistics programming, timeline therapy, hypnosis and whole brain intelligence (she is also accredited with the relevant boards in America). It was these skills that guided her develop a program to help others become both depression- and pill-free.

Naked Therapy
Combining all of these techniques, Tamar has experience with both westerner and eastern psychological modalities in healing, while developing her own therapeutic technique entitled, Naked Therapy. The foundation of Naked Therapy is one of self-love, leading those to practice self-kindness and compassion while cultivating an openness toward inner wisdom. 

While exploring relationships to find her Prince, that she learnt: 'The most important relationship is the relationship you have with yourself.' This formed the basis for her second book, Getting Naked – The Dating Game (2011), where she navigates her way through the dating landscape of flirtatious flings and romantic rendezvous, sharing her intimate tales of finding love. She was labelled The Relationship Queen or The Queen of Hearts. Her ability to help people fall in love with their own unique selves; winning her spots on national television shows such as Seven Network's The Morning Show and Sunrise and Network 10's The Circle.

She is a regular guest on radio stations around Australia and her articles can be read in leading publications such as The Sunday Herald Sun's Body and Soul section, Women's Health and Fitness magazine, Good Health magazine and her own sex column in Nature and Health magazine.

Mercieca also applies her healing therapy to sexual issues, being invited to be Sexpo Australia's Relationship Expert (2013-2015). She has presented keynote talks at the Celebrating Sexuality Sex Camp in Victoria, the Sacred Sex and Consciousness Conference in Byron Bay as well as the Seven Sisters Festival in Victoria. More recently Mercieca was invited to take to the TED stage and share her journey into self-love.

Mercieca's passion lies in helping people feel comfortable and confident in their own skin, and it was this ambition that saw her compete and win a pin up competition in Queensland where she was titled 'Miss Garterbelts and Gasoline 2011' With a love of all things vintage, Mercieca enjoys playing drums with her band and sipping tea in the Dandenongs as she crafts her latest manuscript.

Awards and nominations

References

External links
 Getting Naked Website – Tamra Mercica's Website

Australian radio personalities
Australian women radio presenters
Australian writers
Australian women writers
Life coaches
Living people
1980 births
People from Kyneton